Hvis lille pige er du? is a 1963 Danish comedy film directed by Erik Balling and starring Ghita Nørby.

Cast
 Ghita Nørby - Eva
 Dirch Passer - Hans
 Maria Garland - Hans' mor
 Johannes Meyer - Zimmermann
 Paul Hagen - Benny
 Judy Gringer - Susie
 Ingeborg Skov - Fru Thurøe
 Baard Owe - Johannes
 Carl Johan Hviid - Joachim
 Hans Kurt - Direktør Jansen
 Birgitte Federspiel - Fru Jansen

References

External links

1963 films
1960s Danish-language films
1963 comedy films
Films directed by Erik Balling
Films with screenplays by Erik Balling
Danish black-and-white films
Danish comedy films